Cellana strigilis is a species of large limpet, a marine gastropod mollusc in the family Nacellidae, one of the families of true limpets.

Subspecies
Subspecies within this species as listed by Powell 1979 include:

 Cellana strigilis strigilis, the nominate subspecies
 Cellana strigilis bollonsi
 Cellana strigilis chathamensis
 Cellana strigilis flemingi
 Cellana strigilis oliveri
 Cellana strigilis redimiculum

References

 Powell A. W. B., William Collins Publishers Ltd, Auckland 1979

External links
  Reisser C., Marshall B.A. & Gardner J. (2012) A morphometric approach supporting genetic results in the taxonomy of the New Zealand limpets of the Cellana strigilis complex (Mollusca : Patellogastropoda : Nacellidae). Invertebrate Systematics 26: 193–203

Nacellidae
Gastropods of New Zealand
Gastropods described in 1841